Maciej Pawlikowski (born 19 February 1951) is a Polish mountaineer. He is best known for the first winter ascent of Cho Oyu together with Maciej Berbeka on 12 February 1985. He is also the current president of the Zakopane Mountaineering Club.

References

External links
K2 expedition (in Polish)
MountEverest.net Mountaineering website

Polish summiters of Mount Everest
Polish mountain climbers
Living people
1953 births
Sportspeople from Zakopane
Recipients of the Order of Polonia Restituta